George Noller (February 2, 1843 – May 13, 1906) was an American farmer and politician.

Born in what is now Germany, Noller emigrated to the United States in 1851 and settled in Delafield, Wisconsin. He then lived in Richfield, Wisconsin and finally in Lake Five, Wisconsin where he farmed. Noller served as town treasurer and was a Democrat. He served in the Wisconsin State Assembly in 1883. Noller died at his home in Lake Five, Wisconsin.

References

1843 births
1906 deaths
German emigrants to the United States
People from Richfield, Washington County, Wisconsin
People from Delafield, Wisconsin
Farmers from Wisconsin
People from Lisbon, Waukesha County, Wisconsin
19th-century American politicians
Democratic Party members of the Wisconsin State Assembly